Altai Nature Reserve (also called ) is a Russian  ('sanctuary, strict nature reserve') in the Altai Mountains of south Siberia, Russia. It is part of the UNESCO World Heritage Site "Golden Mountains of Altai", recognized as an area of high biodiversity and isolation from human intrusion. It is also included in the UNESCO World Network of Biosphere Reserves. It is situated in Ulagansky District and Turochaksky District in the north and east of the Altai Republic.

Topography
The reserve has an elongated shape running from the northeast to southwest along the Teletskoye basin and into the high interior. Lake Teletskoye is in the upper northwest end. The Chulyshman River runs into the lake, with the Chulyshman valley forming part of the western border of the Altia Reserve. Most of the reserve is the plains and alpine ridges of the Chulyshman Highlands. Over 20% of the territory is rock, scree and gravel.

Climate and ecoregion
Altai is located in the Sayan montane conifer forests ecoregion.  This ecoregion is characterized by mountains dissected by river valleys, high levels of precipitation, and high biodiversity. Flora is generally dependent on the elevation and terrain, with forest having three main subzones based on altitude: light needle-leaf sparse taiga, dark needle-leaf taiga, and dark taiga.  The Altai reserve has been for the most part undisturbed by human activity, and is one of the few remaining pristine areas of this ecoregion.  It covers 9.4% of the entire Republic of Altai, and there are no roads in the reserve.

The climate of Altai is a Humid continental climate, with a cool summer (Köppen climate classification Subarctic climate, Dfc). This climate is characterized by mild summers (only 1–3 months above ) and cold, snowy winters (coldest month below ).  Over the past 50 years in the Altai reserve, the warmest month has been July, the coldest month January, and the average rainfall has been .

Flora and fauna
The most common trees in the Altai Reserve coniferous species: Siberian larch, Siberian cedar and Siberian fir. Scientists at the reserves have recorded over 1,500 species of vascular plants, including 22 species listed as 'vulnerable' in the Red Book of the Russian Federation. There are over 70 species of mammals in the reserve, including two endangered species, the Snow Leopard and the Altai argali. There are 19 species of fish, mostly in Lake Teletskoye, including pike, perch, and whitefish. In the streams the most common fish is the grayling. Of the 331 species of birds found in the reserve, most (48%) are passerine (159 species), waders (48 species), Falconiformes (30 species), and geese (29 species). The remaining 66 species account for only 20%.

Ecotourism
As a strict nature reserve, the Altai Reserve is mostly closed to the general public, although scientists and those with "environmental education" purposes can make arrangements with park management for visits.   There are six "ecotourist" routes in the reserve, however, that are open to the public, but require permits to be obtained in advance.  Park management recommends allowing 2–3 months in advance for obtaining permits.  The main office is in the city of Gorno-Altaysk.

The six ecotourist routes open to the public (permits required) are:
  Chichelgansky Zigzag.  Overlook of Lake Teletskoye, ethno-cultural visitor center, Yaylyu waterway hike. (website (in Russian)
  Belinskaya Terrace.  Ancient monuments of the Turkic period - "Kaeser-Tash" (stone warrior), "IT-Bash" (stone-dog).  (website (in Russian))
  Corbou Waterfall .  25 km boat ride and hike.  13 meter waterfall.  (website (in Russian))
  Cordon Chelyush - Waterfall.  Softwood forest, overviews of Altai.  (website (in Russian))  
  Kokshe Waterfall.  Orientation by reserve ranger, hike to Kokshe Waterfall on the Koskhe River (largest right bank tributary of Lake Teletskoye.  (website (in Russian))
  Great Falls of the Chulchinsky.  Hike for experienced mountain hikers only.  (website (in Russian))

See also
 List of Russian Nature Reserves (class 1a "zapovedniks")
 Wikicommons Gallery: Lake Teletskoye

References

External links
 Official Website, Altai Nature Reserve (In English)
 Maps of the Reserve and Surrounding Protected Areas
 Video Gallery, Altai Biosphere
 Map of Altai Nature Reserve at OpenStreetMap
 Map of Altai Nature Reserve at ProtectedPlanet.org 

Nature reserves in Russia
Biosphere reserves of Russia
1932 establishments in Russia
Protected areas established in 1932
Geography of the Altai Republic
Zapovednik